The Dwight B. Demeritt Forest is a protected area of Penobscot County, Maine owned by the University of Maine. It is located in the adjacent municipalities of Old Town and Orono, Maine. Totaling , the Forest is used for education, demonstrations, research, and recreation, including hiking and cross-country skiing. According to the New England Mountain Biking Association, 35,000 to 50,000 people visit the space each year. It contains over 15 miles of trails.

In 1939, forested land adjacent to the campus was leased by the University which was purchased by university outright in 1955. In 1971, the parcel was named for Dwight B. Demeritt, who, as head of the University's Forest Department, had helped procure the land.

References

Protected areas affiliated with the University of Maine
1939 establishments in Maine
Protected areas established in 1939
Old Town, Maine
Orono, Maine
Protected areas of Penobscot County, Maine